Travesties is a 1974 play by Tom Stoppard. The play centres on the figure of Henry Carr, an elderly man who reminisces about Zürich in 1917 during the First World War, and his interactions with James Joyce when he was writing Ulysses, Tristan Tzara during the rise of Dada, and Lenin leading up to the Russian Revolution, all of whom were living in Zürich at that time.

Plot
The play is primarily set in Zürich, Switzerland during the First World War. At that time, three important personalities were living in Zürich: the modernist author James Joyce, the communist revolutionary Lenin, and Dada founder Tristan Tzara. The play centres on the less notable Henry Carr, a British consular official (also mentioned in Joyce's novel Ulysses), as he recalls his perceptions and experiences with these influential figures. As he reminisces, Carr's memory becomes prone to distraction, and instead of predictable historical biography, these characters are interpreted through the maze of his mind.

Carr's memories are couched in a Zürich production of Oscar Wilde's play The Importance of Being Earnest in which he had a starring role. Stoppard uses this production and Carr's mixed feelings surrounding it as a framework to explore art, the war and revolution. Situations from Earnest feature prominently within the action. The characters in Travesties also include versions of two characters from Earnest, Gwendolen and Cecily, and the comedic situations of many of the other roles are shared by other characters. Stoppard uses many linguistic devices within the play, including puns, limericks, and an extended parody of the vaudeville song "Mister Gallagher and Mister Shean".

Background
The real Carr did play Algernon with a group of actors called The English Players, for whom the real James Joyce was the business manager. Carr and Joyce had an angry disagreement after the play, which led to legal action and accusations of slander by Joyce. The dispute was settled with the judge deciding in favour of both disputants on different counts. Joyce later parodied Carr, and the English Consul General in Zürich at that time, A. Percy Bennett, as two minor characters in Ulysses, with Carr being portrayed as a drunken, obscene soldier in the "Circe" episode.

After the first performance of Travesties Stoppard received a letter from Henry Carr's widow, expressing her surprise that her late husband had been included as a character in Stoppard's play.

Production history

Original production
Travesties was first produced at the Aldwych Theatre, London, on 10 June 1974, by the Royal Shakespeare Company. The production was directed by Peter Wood and designed by Carl Toms, with lighting by Robert Ornbo. It closed on 13 March 1976 after 156 performances at the Aldwych and the Albery Theatres in London, and the Ethel Barrymore Theater in New York City.

 Henry Carr – John Wood
 Tristan Tzara – John Hurt
 James Joyce – Tom Bell
 Vladimir Lenin – Frank Windsor
 Bennett – John Bott
 Gwendolen – Maria Aitken
 Cecily – Beth Morris
 Nadya – Barbara Leigh-Hunt

Cast changes
 Tristan Tzara: Robert Powell; Tim Curry
 James Joyce:  John Quentin; James Booth
 Vladimir Lenin: Harry Towb
 Gwendolen: Meg Wynn Owen
 Nadya: Frances Cuka

Travesties was subsequently produced by the Boston University School of Theater Arts.

1978 German TV film
A German version was directed for TV by Hans Lietzau, and :de:Hans W. Reichel in 1978 with Martin Benrath, Nikolaus Paryla, and :de:Klaus Guth.

1993 production
A revival of the play, with a revised text which abbreviated Cecily's lecture on Lenin in Act II by moving much of it to the interval, was given by the Royal Shakespeare Company at its theatre in the Barbican Arts Centre in September 1993, directed by Adrian Noble. The production was transferred to the Savoy Theatre in March 1994 and ran there until June 1994. A reading was given at the British Library in February 2008, featuring John Hurt.

 Henry Carr – Antony Sher
 Tristan Tzara – David Westhead
 James Joyce –  Lloyd Hutchinson
 Vladimir Lenin – Geoffrey Freshwater
 Bennett – Trevor Martin
 Gwendolen Carr – Rebecca Saire
 Cecily Carruthers – Amanda Harris
 Nadya – Darlene Johnson

2016-2017 production
A new revival, directed by Patrick Marber, was performed at the Menier Chocolate Factory from September until November 2016. The production "broke box office records at the Menier Chocolate Factory, becoming the first play in the company’s history to sell out ahead of its first preview". In February 2017 the play, and company, transferred to the Apollo Theatre in London, where the run continued until April 2017.

 Henry Carr – Tom Hollander
 Gwendolen Carr – Amy Morgan
 Tristan Tzara – Freddie Fox
 Cecily Carruthers – Clare Foster
 Vladimir Lenin – Forbes Masson
 James Joyce – Peter McDonald
 Nadya – Sarah Quist
 Bennett – Tim Wallers

The production's designer was Tim Hatley, the lighting designer Neil Austin, and Adam Cork was the sound designer and composer of original music.

2018 production
Patrick Marber's revival transferred to Broadway in Spring 2018, with Tom Hollander reprising his role as Henry Carr and Peter McDonald reprising his as James Joyce. Travesties opened on 24 April 2018 at the Roundabout Theatre Company's American Airlines Theater in New York.

 Henry Carr – Tom Hollander
 James Joyce – Peter McDonald 
 Tristan Tzara – Seth Numrich
 Lenin – Dan Butler
 Gwendolen – Scarlett Strallen
 Cecily – Sara Topham
 Nadya – Opal Alladin
 Bennett – Patrick Kerr

The Roundabout Theatre Company's education team have produced an 'Upstage' guide to Travesties which puts the play's themes in historical context and contains interviews with the director, cast, and crew. The revival has been praised by critics with Ben Brantley of The New York Times commenting that he "...would venture that this latest incarnation is the clearest and surely one of the liveliest on record. It should prove ridiculously entertaining for anyone with even a passing knowledge of its central characters, and a stroll through the groves of Wikipedia should offer adequate preparation for anyone else."

2019 Australian production
The Australian premiere of the 2016 script adaptation opened in Melbourne in Winter 2019, with Dion Mills taking the role of Henry Carr. The  production was directed by Jennifer Sarah Dean.

 Henry Carr – Dion Mills
 James Joyce – Johnathan Peck 
 Tristan Tzara – Matthew Connell
 Lenin – Syd Brisbane
 Gwendolen – Joanna Halliday
 Cecily – Gabrielle Sing
 Nadya – Milliana Cancur
 Bennett – Tref Gare

Awards and nominations

Awards

1976 Broadway Production
 1976 New York Drama Critics' Circle Award for Best Play
 1976 Tony Award for Best Play
 1976 Evening Standard Award for Best Comedy
 1976 Tony Award for Best Actor in a Play – John Wood

Nominations

2017 West End Production
Laurence Olivier Award for Best Revival
Laurence Olivier Award for Best Actor – Tom Hollander
Laurence Olivier Award for Best Actor in a Supporting Role – Freddie Fox
Laurence Olivier Award for Best Actress in a Supporting Role – Claire Foster
Laurence Olivier Award for Best Sound Design – Adam Cork
WhatsOnStage Award for Best Play Revival
WhatsOnStage Award for Best Supporting Actor in a Play – Freddie Fox

2018 Broadway Revival
 Tony Award for Best Revival of a Play
 Tony Award for Best Actor in a Leading Role in a Play – Tom Hollander
 Tony Award for Best Sound Design of a Play – Adam Cork
 Tony Award for Best Direction of a Play – Patrick Marber
 Drama Desk Award for Best Revival of a Play
 Drama Desk Award for Outstanding Actor in a Play – Tom Hollander
 Outer Critics Circle Award for Outstanding Revival of a Play (Broadway or Off-Broadway)
 Outer Critics Circle Award for Outstanding Actor in a Play – Tom Hollander
 Outer Critics Circle Award for Outstanding Director of a Play – Patrick Marber
 Drama League Award for Outstanding Revival of a Broadway or Off-Broadway Play
 Distinguished Performance Award – Tom Hollander and Seth Numrich

References

Bibliography

Further reading

External links
  (show)
  (production)

1974 plays
Broadway plays
New York Drama Critics' Circle Award winners
Plays by Tom Stoppard
Tony Award-winning plays
Plays based on real people
Cultural depictions of Vladimir Lenin
James Joyce